Beatrice Burnham (October 2, 1902 – January 8, 1995) was an American film actress in silent films.

Selected filmography

 Ramona (1916)
 Jack and Jill (1917)
 The Petal on the Current (1919)
Upstairs (1919)
 Hitchin' Posts (1920)
 Bullet Proof (1920)
 Burnt Wings (1920)
 The Home Stretch (1921)
 Three Sevens (1921)
 Diamonds Adrift (1921)
 Get Your Man (1921)
 Trooper O'Neill (1922)
 Tracks (1922)
 A Million to Burn (1923)
 The Flame of Life (1923)
 Kindled Courage (1923)
 Western Luck (1924)
 Siege (1925)
 Riders of the Purple Sage (1925)

References

External links
 
 

1902 births
1995 deaths
20th-century American actresses
American film actresses